Charles Aimé Halpin (30 August 1930 – 16 April 1994) was the archbishop of the Roman Catholic Archdiocese of Regina, Saskatchewan, Canada from 12 December 1973 until his death.

Biography
Born 30 August 1930 in St. Eustache, Manitoba, he was ordained a priest at St. Eustache on 27 May 1956. A native bilingual Francophone during a period of amiable interaction with other Christian denominations both his leadership among clergy and laypeople of his Archbishopric and with fellow Christian clergy and laypeople of other denominations were of unprecedented cordiality and inspiration.

He died at Pasqua Hospital in Regina on 16 April 1994.

See also
Holy Rosary Cathedral (Regina, Saskatchewan)
Our Lady of Assumption Co-Cathedral
List of cathedrals in Canada

Notes

External links
Rosary Cathedral (Regina)

1930 births
1994 deaths
Archbishops in Canada
Roman Catholic archbishops of Regina